Ortaköy Mosque or Büyük Mecidiye Camii in Beşiktaş, Istanbul, Turkey, is a mosque situated at the waterside of the Ortaköy pier square, one of the most popular locations on the Bosphorus. It was commissioned by the Ottoman sultan Abdülmecid I and its construction was completed around 1854 or 1856.

This structure is symbolic of the district of Ortaköy as it has a distinctive view of the Bosphorus Strait of Istanbul and the Bosphorus Bridge. The mosque is visible from Bosphorus cruises and ferries.

History

On the site of the present-day Ortaköy Mosque there was previously a small mosque built in 1720 and ruined during the Patrona Halil Uprising in 1731. The current mosque was commissioned by the Ottoman sultan Abdülmecid I and built or completed around 1854 or 1856 (the exact dates of construction vary between scholarly sources). Its architects were Armenian father and son Garabet Balyan and Nikoğos Balyan, who worked as a team and who also designed the nearby Dolmabahçe Palace and the Dolmabahçe Mosque in 1853–1855.

The single dome of the mosque was originally built using bricks. However, the dome developed cracks throughout time and was ready to collapse, so a new dome was reconstructed using concrete. In 1894, there was an earthquake that damaged the mosque, and it also suffered a minor fire in 1984. Thus, the structure has undergone a number of repair and restoration work in its time. Today, it is in fair shape.

Architecture 
As with their other projects in Istanbul, the Balyans designed the mosque in a mixed or eclectic style incorporating contemporary European Revivalist trends such as Neoclassical, along with some details and overall design elements drawn from the earlier Ottoman Baroque style. However, it is distinguished from other mosques of the period by its particularly ornate stone-carved decoration.

The building consists of a two-story imperial apartment for the sultan, which has a U-shaped plan, and a main prayer hall for the mosque, which has a square plan covered with one dome. The facades with engaged columns are decorated by carved stone reliefs, giving the mosque a "dynamic appearance". There are two rows of windows providing the mosque with illumination. The reconstructed dome was built from concrete, while stone was used to build the two, slim minarets. The minarets have balconies resembling Corinthian capitals.

The mosque is small in comparison to other mosques on the other side of the Golden Horn. In terms of the interior space, it is modest in scale but the inside is spacious and has wide, tall windows which refract its reflection in water as well as allowing in daylight. Materials like marble and porphyry were used to build the mihrab and minbar. The inside of the dome is adorned with Trompe-l'œil frescoes, which were a feature first introduced to Ottoman architecture during the reign of Abdülmecid I. The trompe-l'œil paintings here include depictions of niche-like windows with curtains as well as rows of mihrabs, executed in a Neo-Renaissance style while also incorporating elements of traditional Islamic architecture and decoration within that style. The mosque's interior also features several panels of calligraphy executed by Abdülmecid I himself, as he was a calligrapher along with being a sultan.

Notes

References

Citations

Sources 

Beşiktaş
Bosphorus
Garabet Amira Balyan buildings
Nigoğayos Balyan buildings
Ottoman mosques in Istanbul
Religious buildings and structures completed in 1856
19th-century mosques
Baroque mosques of the Ottoman Empire
19th-century religious buildings and structures in Turkey